The  Korea Professional Baseball season is 33rd season in the history of the Korea Professional Baseball.

Season Structure

Regular season
Starting in season 2013, each team plays 128 games in the regular season, reduced from 133 due to expansion to nine teams. Each team plays every other 16 times.

There will be a third change in four seasons to the tie rule in South Korean professional baseball. In South Korean baseball, ties are called after 12 innings in the regular season and 15 innings in the playoffs. In 2008, the league briefly scrapped ties and forced teams to play until a winner was decided. But managers strongly opposed the change. The KBO went back to the 12-inning tie rule starting in 2009.

Video Replay
Responding to growing calls to address issues in refereeing, presidents of the teams in the country's top baseball league have agreed to expand video replay starting in the second half of the season, officials said on 8 July. Currently, the KBO umpires rely on video replay for disputed home run calls only. The instant replay coverage on home runs was introduced in 2009. Under the present KBO rules, umpires' decisions on safe-out and fair-foul calls are final and managers or coaches may not protest those calls. The league's umpires, though, have been on the hot seat for most of this season with some high-profile missed calls. With every KBO game broadcast live on cable television and available for free streaming online for domestic viewers, and with improved technology breaking down disputed plays from multiple angles, umpires also work under heavier scrutiny than in the past.

Before this season, the KBO brass had said the league would conduct feasibility studies on expanded video review and that it would consider making the move by as early as 2015. At their meeting in May, the league's general managers discussed expanding video replay but decided to put the issue on hold until the end of this season, citing technical difficulties.

With the pressure mounting to make changes, though, the KBO team presidents caved in and agreed to expand the replay in the second half, which begins on 22 July following the All-Star break. The KBO said it will convene its rules committee to revise the rule book, and settle on specifics of the expansion in a meeting of field managers ahead of the All-Star Game on 18 July. Before this season, Major League Baseball (MLB) decided to expand its review process to cover fair-foul calls and force play at bases, among other categories.

All-Star Game
On 18 July, the best players participated in the Korean All-Star Game. The franchises participating were divided into two regions: Eastern League Team (Samsung Lions, Doosan Bears, Lotte Giants, SK Wyverns) and Western League Team (Kia Tigers, Hanwha Eagles, LG Twins, Nexen Heroes, NC Dinos). The titles 'Eastern' and 'Western' do not directly correspond to the geographical regions of the franchises involved, as both SK and Doosan, being from Incheon and Seoul respectively, are based in the Western region of Korea, despite representing the East. Unlike in Major League Baseball, the Korean All-Star Game does not determine home-field advantage in the Korean Series. The game was played at Gwangju-Kia Champions Field and won 13-2 by Western League Team on 18 July 2014.

Postseason
Korea Professional Baseball season culminates in its championship series, known as the Korean Series. Currently, the top four teams qualify for the postseason based on win–loss records. The team with the best record gains a direct entry into the Korean Series, while the other three teams compete for the remaining place in a step-ladder playoff system:

Semi-Playoff (best-of-five, added from 3 games starting from 2008)
Regular Season 3rd place vs. Regular Season 4th place
Playoff (best-of-five, reduced from 7 games starting from 2009)
Regular Season 2nd place vs. Semi-Playoff Winner
Korean Series (best-of-seven)
Regular Season 1st place vs. Playoff Winner

To determine the final standings
Champion (1st place): Korean Series Winner
Runner-up (2nd place): Korean Series Loser
3rd–9th place: Sort by Regular Season record except teams to play in the Korean Series.

Standings

Source

Postseason

Semi-Playoff

^: postponed from 20 October due to rain

Playoff

Korean Series

Foreign hitters 
Each team could have signed up to three foreign players. Due to the high proportion of pitchers signed in previous years, and there being no foreign hitters at all in 2012–2013, beginning in 2014 the league mandated that at least one of the foreign players must be a position player.

Average home attendances

 LG Twins 18,241
 Doosan Bears 17,630
 SK Wyverns 12,965
 Lotte Giants 12,962
 KIA Tigers 10,366
 Samsung Lions 7,891
 Hanwha Eagles 7,424
 NC Dinos 7,297
 Nexen Heroes 6,921
Source:

References

External links

KBO League seasons
Korea Professional Baseball Season, 2014
Korea Korea Professional Baseball season